Proletarian Party may refer to:
 Proletarian Catalan Party, a political party in Catalonia, Spain
 Proletarian Liberation Party, a political party in Brazil
 Proletarian Masses Party, a short-lived political party in Japan
 Proletarian parties in Japan, 1925–1932, a group of political parties in Japan
 Proletarian Nationalist Party, a political party in Peru
 Proletarian Party of Peru, a communist party in Peru
 Proletarian Party of America, a communist party in the United States, 1920–1971
 Proletarian Party (Murba), a defunct national communist political party in Indonesia
 Purba Banglar Sarbahara Party, a Bangladeshi communist party